Crime in Greater Manchester has the  Crime in Greater Manchester is the responsibility of the GMP (Greater Manchester Police and its chief constable Ian Hopkins). Its PCC was abolished in May 2017.

History
Greater Manchester is the second-largest metropolitan area in the UK outside of London. The area had around 334,000 recorded crimes in 2018, compared to around 165,000 for Lancashire and around 134,000 for Merseyside. Similar to Greater Manchester's number of crimes are West Yorkshire (291,000 in 2018), West Midlands (252,000 in 2018) and Kent (197,000). The Metropolitan Police had 835,000 recorded crimes in 2018.

Types of crime

Violence against the person
Violence against the person accounts for 17% of total crime in the city.

Criminal damage
Criminal damage accounts for 10% of total crime.

Burglary
Burglary accounts for 8% of crime.

Motoring
Around 124,000 speeding motorists were caught from 2018 to 2019, the most in the UK, and around 2,600 more than London.

Terrorism
Manchester was bombed by the IRA in 1992 and 1996 and by an Islamist suicide bomber in 2017.

Areas
Of all the Greater Manchester boroughs, Manchester has the highest incidence of crime, followed by Rochdale and Oldham. Trafford has the lowest incidence of crime in Greater Manchester.

Facilities
The National Ballistics Intelligence Service (NABIS), known as the Northern NABIS Hub, is in Manchester, where the organisation works with the Integrated Ballistics Identification System (IBIS).

See also
 Crime in Merseyside
 Gun crime in south Manchester 
 Greater Manchester Police Museum
 Law enforcement in the United Kingdom

References

External links
 Policing in Greater Manchester

 
Organised crime in England